The rectus capitis posterior major (or rectus capitis posticus major, both being Latin for larger posterior straight muscle of the head) arises by a pointed tendon from the spinous process of the axis, and, becoming broader as it ascends, is inserted into the lateral part of the inferior nuchal line of the occipital bone and the surface of the bone immediately below the line.

A soft tissue connection bridging from the rectus capitis posterior major to the cervical dura mater was described in 2011. Various clinical manifestations may be linked to this anatomical relationship. It has also been postulated that this connection serves as a monitor of dural tension along with the rectus capitis posterior minor and the obliquus capitis inferior.

As the muscles of the two sides pass upward and lateralward, they leave between them a triangular space, in which the rectus capitis posterior minor is seen.

Its main actions are to extend and rotate the atlanto-occipital joint.

See also
 Atlanto-occipital joint
 Rectus capitis lateralis
 Rectus capitis posterior minor muscle
 Rectus capitis anterior muscle

Additional images

References

External links

 PTCentral
 
 

Muscles of the head and neck